Denmoza rhodacantha is a species of cactus in the genus Denmoza that was described by Nathaniel Lord Britton and Joseph Nelson Rose  in 1922.

Description 
Denmoza rhodocantha starts out as a globular cactus and stays that way for quite some time before growing into a 0.5-1.5 cm column.

References 

Trichocereeae
Plants described in 1922